This is a list of Albanian film composers.

Film composers
 Prenkë Jakova (1917-1969)
 Nikolla Zoraqi (1928-1991)
 Feim Ibrahimi (1935-1997)
 Limoz Dizdari (1942)
 Thomas Simaku (1958)

References

Albanian film score composers